Stephen Elwood George (born April 11, 1951) is a former American football defensive tackle who played two seasons in the National Football League with the St. Louis Cardinals and Atlanta Falcons. He was drafted by the St. Louis Cardinals in the third round of the 1974 NFL Draft. He played college football at the University of Houston and attended Plano Senior High School in Plano, Texas.

References

External links
Just Sports Stats

Living people
1951 births
Players of American football from Texas
American football defensive tackles
Houston Cougars football players
St. Louis Cardinals (football) players
Atlanta Falcons players
People from Sulphur Springs, Texas